The following is a list of Fordham Rams football seasons for the football team that has represented Fordham University in NCAA competition during their years as a Division I-A/FBS program.

Seasons

Fordham, which had previously suspended football during the 1943-1945 seasons due to World War II, dropped the program entirely following the 1954 season. Students brought the sport back as a club team in 1964. The university again granted varsity status in 1970. The program played at the D-III level until finally regaining Division I status in 1989. 

The following is a list of Fordham Rams football seasons for the football team that has represented Fordham University in NCAA competition during their years as a Division I-AA/FCS program.

Seasons

Fordham, a Patriot League football member since 1990, was ruled ineligible for conference titles between the 2010-2013 seasons. This was due to use of scholarship players prior to the rest of the league's vote to do the same. League games during this time counted in the overall record but not in the conference standings.

References

Lists of college football seasons

Fordham Rams football seasons